Aimé Koudou (born 18 November 1976) is an Ivorian former professional footballer who played as a striker.

Career
Koudou spent the early part of his career playing in Spain, France, Switzerland and Cyprus with Real Oviedo, Sochaux, Neuchâtel Xamax and AEL Limassol.

In 2006 Koudou joined Scottish club Airdrie United, making six appearances in the league during the 2006–07 season. Koudou signed for Scottish Premier League side Kilmarnock on 13 February 2007. While at Kilmarnock, Koudou made eleven league appearances, scoring once against Inverness Caledonian Thistle, before leaving the club in February 2008. He later played with Northern Irish side Portadown.

Career statistics

References

1976 births
Living people
Ivorian footballers
Ivorian expatriate footballers
Ligue 1 players
Ligue 2 players
Championnat National players
Swiss Super League players
Scottish Football League players
Scottish Premier League players
Cypriot First Division players
Real Oviedo players
FC Sochaux-Montbéliard players
SAS Épinal players
Neuchâtel Xamax FCS players
Étoile Carouge FC players
SR Delémont players
AEL Limassol players
Airdrieonians F.C. players
Kilmarnock F.C. players
Portadown F.C. players
Expatriate footballers in Spain
Expatriate footballers in France
Expatriate footballers in Switzerland
Expatriate footballers in Cyprus
Expatriate footballers in Scotland
Expatriate association footballers in Northern Ireland
Ivorian expatriate sportspeople in Spain
Ivorian expatriate sportspeople in France
Ivorian expatriate sportspeople in Switzerland
Ivorian expatriate sportspeople in Cyprus
Ivorian expatriate sportspeople in Scotland
Ivorian expatriate sportspeople in Northern Ireland
Association football forwards